The Latvia national under-18 and under-19 basketball team is the national representative for Latvia in international under-18 and under-19 basketball competitions. They are organized by the Latvian Basketball Association. 

The team competes at the FIBA U18 European Championship, with the opportunity to qualify for the FIBA Under-19 World Cup.

Championships record

FIBA U18 European Championship

FIBA Under-19 World Cup

See also
Latvia national basketball team
Latvia national under-20 basketball team
Latvia national under-17 basketball team

References

External links
Official website 
FIBA profile

 
Men's national under-18 basketball teams
Men's national under-19 basketball teams